is a Japanese former backstroke swimmer who competed in the 1972 Summer Olympics and in the 1976 Summer Olympics.

References

1951 births
Living people
Japanese male backstroke swimmers
Olympic swimmers of Japan
Swimmers at the 1972 Summer Olympics
Swimmers at the 1976 Summer Olympics
Asian Games medalists in swimming
Swimmers at the 1970 Asian Games
Swimmers at the 1974 Asian Games
Asian Games gold medalists for Japan
Medalists at the 1970 Asian Games
Medalists at the 1974 Asian Games
20th-century Japanese people